The single station Leon XIII is part of the massive transport system Bogotá, TransMilenio, opened in the year 2000.

Location 
The station is located in the northeastern sector of Soacha, specifically on the Autopista Sur between 45 and 46 streets. It also serves the demand of the neighborhoods La María, Quintanares, Cazucá, Julio Rincón and its surroundings.

History 
The inauguration of the station was delayed due to the delays of the construction of the I Phase in Soacha.

Etymology 
The station receives the name in direct allusion to the neighborhood, Leon XIII, close to the station.

Service Station

Main Services

References

External links 
 TransMilenio
 www.surumbo.com official interactive query system TransMilenio maps

TransMilenio